The free rifle is a group of events held at the Olympics, beginning in 1896 and continuing to the current programme. Current nomenclature drops the "free" and refers to the event type as simply the "rifle." The women's 50 metre version has also been referred to as the "standard" and "sport" rifle. The "free" rifle is distinct from the military rifle, air rifle, and small-bore rifle.

The current Olympic programme includes two free rifle events: the ISSF 50 meter rifle three positions for both men (since 1952) and women (since 1984; women were nominally allowed to compete with the men from 1968 to 1980, although very few women participated these years). Two other events were held for numerous Games: the 300 m rifle three positions for men from 1900 to 1920 and from 1948 to 1972 and the ISSF 50 meter rifle prone for men from 1912 to 2016 (excluding 1920 and 1924). The 300 m rifle prone is a shooting discipline held at the world championships but never consistently at the Olympics.

There was a 300-metre free rifle event in 1896 without position requirements. In 1900, medals were awarded for each of the three positions in the 300 metre free rifle competition, using the scores from the full individual event. There were four team events held, with individual scores summed to give a team result in 1900 and 1920 and separate team shooting in 1908 and 1912. A 600-metre event for men was held in 1912, a 600-metre prone event for men in 1924, and a 1000-yard event for men in 1908.

50 m rifle three positions

Men

Multiple medalists

Medalists by nation

Women

Multiple medalists

Medalists by nation

50 m rifle prone

Men

Multiple medalists

Medalists by nation

300 m rifle three positions

Men

Multiple medalists

Medalists by nation

300 m free rifle

Men

300 m rifle kneeling

Men

300 m rifle prone

Men

300 m rifle standing

Men

300 m rifle team

Men

Multiple medalists

Medalists by nation

600 m rifle

Men

600 m rifle prone

Men

1000 yd rifle

Men

References

Free rifle